This article lists all power stations in Kyrgyzstan.

Thermal

Hydroelectric

See also 
 Energy in Kyrgyzstan
 List of power stations in Europe
 List of largest power stations in the world

References

Kyrgyzstan
 
Power stations